The Theatre Royal is an art-deco theatre in Norwich, Norfolk, England. It is one of the country's oldest established theatres.

It hosts a large range of touring productions. The theatre had a £10m refurbishment in 2007, designed by Tim Foster Architects.

In 2015, plans were launched for the new £15m Stage Two building under the direction of the then CEO Peter Wilson MBE. The new building was to house one of Europe's arts education facilities, and a new 200 seat auditorium.

In 2016, it was announced that Peter was to depart the Theatre Royal, after 25 years at the helm. It was later announced that the new auditorium would be named the Peter Wilson Studio.

In mid 2016, Stephen Crocker, a former deputy CEO of The Lowry theatre was announced as the new Chief Executive.

In 2019, the theatre was rebranded under the Norwich Theatre umbrella, alongside Norwich Theatre Playhouse and Stage Two.

Shows 
A traditional family pantomime is produced in-house annually for the Christmas season each year. The 2022 panto is Jack and the Beanstalk, starring Rufus Hound, Joe Tracini and Amanda Henderson.

History 
The second Theatre Royal (previous to the building pictured) was built in 1826.
The theatre announced its opening.

The popular magician Ching Lau Lauro received a bad review there, from the Norfolk Chronicle, in 1828.

Just over a year after the theatre burnt down its successor was revealed.

In 1894 the theatre was closed for several months in order to carry out a scheme of reconstruction and redecoration from the designs of  Frank Matcham.

The theatre owner's death in 1902 led to its auction.

In November Harry Lauder made his first visit to Norwich with his BIG VARIETY ROAD SHOW in 1935.

George Barnes played The Grand Vizier to John Inman's Wishee Washee in Aladdin Christmas 1975. This was to be George's 33rd pantomime season.

Television newsreader Helen McDermott landed a part as Helen the Sultana of Booberoomba, doubling as a tavern wench, in Dick Whittington and His Cat in January 2001.

Mother Goose, the 2001 pantomime beat box office targets by £10,000.

A Birthday profit for Norwich Theatre Royal in 2002 as it celebrated its tenth anniversary since reopening, with a profit of £76,000, more than twice the previous year's surplus. The 2002 pantomime was Jack and the Beanstalk starring Rikki Jay.

In January 2004 the theatre received a tax reimbursement of more than £1 million, making it the latest venue to benefit from new rules that entitled organisations to reclaim VAT on ticket sales.

Vicki Carr played the title role in Sleeping Beauty in 2004.

Jay appeared for his eighth consecutive year, the previous year's pantomime had grossed £627,000 with 98% of capacity is virtually unheard of elsewhere. This year was Peter Pan, with Derek Griffiths as Captain Hook , whilst Jay played Smee.

See also
 Norwich Playhouse
 Norfolk and Norwich Festival
 Maddermarket Theatre
 Sewell Barn Theatre

References

Theatres in Norwich